Lengo is a Southeast Solomonic language of Guadalcanal.

Phonology

Vowels

Lengo has 6 vowels.

The front open-mid vowel  never occurs in sequence.

Consonants

Lengo has 15 consonants.

Voiced stops are prenasalized. Two instances of regional variation in these phonemes have been observed. These are  becoming , and  becoming .

Morphology

Pronominal systems
Lengo has five sets of pronominal forms. These are emphatic, subject reference, object, direct possessor, and indirect possessor. These distinguish maximally between four persons (first person inclusive and exclusive, second, and third person), and four numbers (singular, plural, dual, and paucal). There is no grammatical gender distinction, but there is an animacy distinction in the object paradigm. Two further uses of these pronominal forms occur - a reflexive pronoun, and a set of interrogative pronouns.

The dual and paucal forms are derived from the plural forms by the addition of ko- and tu- respectively.
The dual forms are used only to indicate 'two and only two', whilst the plural and paucal forms mean 'two or more' and 'three or more' respectively. First person exclusive excludes the addresse(s).

Emphatic pronouns
The emphatic pronoun in Lengo is optional, and can occur in combination with obligatory pronouns that may occur with subject or object function. It can also appear without other pronouns. It is used to emphasize the semantic role of a noun in a clause.
 

Examples:

Subject reference pronouns
The subject reference pronoun appears as the first element in a verb phrase. It is obligatory in any main clause, but can be excepted in subordinate clauses. It is optional in imperative sentences.

Example:

Object pronouns
The object form in Lengo is identified using a set of pronominal suffixes, which index the object arguments on the verb. In instances where a verb takes both a direct and indirect object, only the indirect object is marked. The third person plural object form is marked for animate or inanimate objects.

Example:

Direct possessor pronouns
The direct possessor form is used for inalienably possessed nouns. It is a suffix on the possessed noun that indicates the possessor. In the case of the dual and paucal forms, number is indicated as a prefix on the noun, and the plural form of the possessive suffix is used.

The third person singular direct possessor appears in two forms, with '-a' being more prevalent than '-na'.

Examples:

Indirect possessor pronouns
The indirect possessor form is used for alienably possessed nouns. It occurs as a free morpheme preceding the possessed noun. There are two categories distinguished - 'oral consumable' and 'general'. The oral consumable category includes items that are able to be eaten, drunk, or consumed via the mouth, such as tobacco.

Oral consumable form:

General form:

Reflexive pronouns
A reflexive pronoun is composed when a direct possessor suffix is added to the stem 'tibo'. This results in a valency decrease of the verb.

Examples:

Interrogative and relative pronouns
Lengo has two pronouns that have interrogative or relative uses. 'thi' is used if the reference is human, and 'tha' if the reference is non-human.

Relative use:

Interrogative use:

Negation
There are several ways to indicate negation in Lengo.

There is the discontinuous morpheme mo 'NEG', which surrounds the verb being negated. There are three modals which can appear in the serial verb construction and are negative (teigha), prohibitive (tabu) or non-volitive (kou). Lastly, there is the auxiliary boro 'impossible FUT', which is sometimes glossed as 'NEG' and can negate the verb.

The mo ... mo 'NEG ... NEG' structure can also be combined with teigha 'NEG' to create a double negative, which carries the meaning of a strong affirmative.

Discontinuous morpheme mo ... mo
The grammatical negator, the mo ... mo 'NEG ... NEG' structure, is the only instance of a 'discontinuous' morpheme in Lengo. The morpheme mo appears both before and after the verb being negated. The basic structure of this construction is mo V mo, as seen in (13) and (14):

A variant of this construction is mo ... moa, as seen in (15).

Note that although all examples presented by Unger show mo ... mo 'NEG ... NEG' used for a negative imperative, it should not be assumed that this construction is exclusive to a particular sentence structure. More examples are needed for a satisfactory conclusion.

Regardless, mo ... mo is an uncommon negator in Lengo. Much more frequently used is the modal teigha 'NEG'.

Modals
Lengo has a 'serial verb construction'. The various types of serial verb construction identified are directional, sequential, causative, manner, ambient, comitative, dative, instrumental and modal. The basic structure of a modal serial verb construction is as follows:

V + na V(-O)

The first verb is the modal verb, and the second verb follows an article (always na). This second verb is treated somewhat like an infinitive. Lengo has five modal verbs; of these, three are used to create negative constructions. These three are:

Negative teigha
Of all the ways to express negation in Lengo, the modal teigha 'NEG' is the most versatile and often used. It can be used to negate verbs in statements, like in (16):

In (17) and (18), teigha appears at the very beginning of the serial verb construction, and the realis locative t-i appears between the negator and the article na. The entire serial verb construction is negated by teigha.

Sometimes the construction teigha na undergoes elision and is shortened to tena, like in (19):

It is important to note that this shortened form tena 'NEG' should not be confused with tena 'LOC'. Refer to example (20), which shows both homophones in use: the first being the locative and the second (bolded) being the combined modal and article.

Teigha is flexible and can be used to create negative polar questions and answer polar questions, as in examples (21), (22) and (23).

Example (21) is a negative polar question which can be answered with either eo 'yes' or teigha 'no'. Answering with eo would mean 'yes, I have not seen your basket', whereas answering with teigha would mean 'no, I have seen it'.

In example (22), teigha is used to answer a polar question in the negative. In (23), teigha is modified by an adverbial, vata 'continue'.

In (24), o teigha 'or NEG' is added to the end of the sentence to create an alternative question.

A content question can also be answered with teigha, as in (25).

Prohibitive tabu
The word tabu 'prohibitive (with consequences); forbidden' is another common way of forming a negative. It is often used by parents who are correcting their children. As with teigha 'no/none', a clause could consist of the single word Tabu! 'Don't!' The basic structure is the same as with other modals: the first verb is the modal, and it is followed by the article na and the second verb.

In (26), the consequence of disobeying is explicitly addressed. In (27), the article na is omitted, and the consequence of 'or else ...' is implied.

Non-volitive kou
The third and last negative modal is kou 'unwilling', which is used to indicate non-volition. It appears in the same place as teigha and tabu, but carries a more specific meaning.

In example (28), if the more general teigha 'NEG' had been used instead of kou, it would simply mean that the fish do not eat the bait. However, in (28), the fish not only do not eat the bait, but they will not.

Example (29) has the words laka 'also' and t-i 'REAL-LOC' in between the negator and the article na.

Auxiliary boro
In Lengo, tense auxiliaries appear before the subject reference pronoun and verb. There are two tense auxiliaries: bo 'FUT' and boro 'impossible FUT'. While boro is perhaps not a straightforward example of negation, it nevertheless does carry a meaning of 'negation for a reason'. If tabu is specifically prohibitive and kou is specifically non-volitive, then boro can be presented as a negator denoting impossibility. Furthermore, it is sometimes glossed as NEG, as in (30):

Example (31) shows boro glossed as 'impossible'. However, it still has the effect of negating the verb.

Double negative construction
The modal teigha 'NEG can be combined with the mo ... mo 'NEG ... NEG' structure to create a double negative, which carries the meaning of a strong affirmative, as in (32). However, this construction (meaning 'must') is rarely used. Instead, the Pijin form masi 'must', a borrowing from English, is much more common.

Example (33) shows the same sentence as (32), but without either of the negation structures. This example is a simple imperative.

Abbreviations
The following is a list of all the abbreviations used in this article.

O:object
PS:possessor pronoun / person
EP:emphatic pronoun
LIM:limiter

Citations

References

External links 
 Materials on Karnai are included in the open access Arthur Capell collections (AC1 and AC2) held by Paradisec

Gela-Guadalcanal languages
Languages of the Solomon Islands